The Other Story is a 2018 Israeli drama film directed by Avi Nesher. It was screened in the Contemporary World Cinema section at the 2018 Toronto International Film Festival.

Plot
The story follows the wedding planning of two Baalei Teshuva, and the bride's family's plans to sabotage the wedding. The film mainly focuses on the bride's complicated relationship with her father, as well as the divorced parents' relationship with each other.

Cast
 Sasson Gabai as Shlomo Abadi
 Yuval Segal as Yonatan Abadi
 Joy Rieger as Anat Abadi
 Maya Dagan as Tali Abadi
 Nathan Goshen as Shahar, Anat's husband-to-be

References

External links
 

2018 films
2018 drama films
Israeli drama films
2010s Hebrew-language films
Films set in Jerusalem
Films about divorce
Films about Jews and Judaism